"God Must Be Busy" is a song written by Clint Daniels and Michael P. Heeney, and recorded by American country music duo Brooks & Dunn.  It was released in November 2007 as the second single from the album Cowboy Town.  It reached a peak of number 11 on the Hot Country Songs charts in 2008.

Content
Featuring lead vocals from Ronnie Dunn, "God Must Be Busy" tells of a man who is praying to God, asking for help in a failed relationship. Having not yet found a solution to his problems, he begins to list off various problems in the world, saying that God must be busy with those problems.

Chart performance

Year-end charts

Parodies
 American parody artist Cledus T. Judd released a parody of "God Must Be Busy" titled "Garth Must Be Busy" as a duet with Ronnie Dunn on his 2009 album Polyrically Uncorrect.

References 

2007 singles
Brooks & Dunn songs
Song recordings produced by Tony Brown (record producer)
Songs written by Clint Daniels
Arista Nashville singles
Songs written by Michael P. Heeney
2007 songs